Carlos Sareisian (born 3 January 1916, date of death unknown) was an Argentine bobsledder who competed in the early 1950s. He finished eighth in the four-man event at the 1952 Winter Olympics in Oslo.

References
1952 bobsleigh four-man results
Carlos Sareisian's profile at Sports Reference.com

External links
  

1916 births
Year of death missing
Argentine male bobsledders
Olympic bobsledders of Argentina
Bobsledders at the 1952 Winter Olympics